Nancy Walbridge Collins specializes in U.S. defense, national security, and military technology. She is the chair of defense and security studies at Columbia University.

Collins is the author of Grey Wars (Yale University Press, 2021), an analysis of America's shifting forms of warfare. Her essays and commentaries appear in a range of publications, including Forbes, The New York Times, TIME, U.S. News & World Report, and The Wall Street Journal.

Since 2010, Collins has worked on special projects for the U.S. Department of Defense as a senior advisor or strategic consultant, dedicated to national mission priorities and leadership assessments. She is a member of the Council on Foreign Relations and the U.S. Commission on Military History. She has served as a senior fellow at the Atlantic Council, at West Point, and at Georgetown University's School of Foreign Service.

Education 

Collins earned her B.A. in government from Georgetown University and M.A. and Ph.D. from the University of London, where she was named the Thornley Fellow, an international prize. Collins graduated from the Loomis Chaffee School and served on its Board of Trustees for a decade.

Awards 

She has been awarded fellowships and grants, from among others, the University of Chicago, Harvard University, the Rockefeller Foundation, the Wilson Center, and Yale University. She is a recipient of the U.S. Congressional Dirksen Award and the NCAFP 21st Century Leadership Award.

Publications 
 Grey Wars: A Contemporary History of U.S. Special Operations (Yale University Press, 2021). Book
The Atlantic Imperative (Atlantic Council, 2021). Essay
Patriotism, Security Strategies, & The Rising Generation, FOX NEWS, July 6, 2013. Article
 “National Responsibility from Abbottabad to Patriots’ Day,” with M. Malvesti, CNN, May 1, 2013.  Article
 “NATO Is Not Enough: The Seven-Continent Strategy,” New York Times, April 23, 2013.  Article
 “The Bell Tolls for the U.S. Military,” TIME Magazine, March 26, 2013. Essay
 “Sequestration Imperatives: Creating 21st Century Force,” U.S. News & World Report,” with M. McGuire IV, March 25, 2013. Article
 “The Unintended Consequences of Highly Sensitive Information Disclosure,” with M. Malvesti, Forbes, February 5, 2013.  Article
""No Easy Day"" Meets Pentagon Hardball," The Wall Street Journal, July 9, 2014. Article

References

External links 
 https://yalebooks.yale.edu/book/9780300198416/grey-wars
https://greywars.info/
https://www.siwps.org/people/nancy-walbridge-collins/
https://www.defensesecurity.org/

1973 births
Loomis Chaffee School alumni
Alumni of the University of London
Columbia University faculty
Georgetown College (Georgetown University) alumni
Living people
American military writers
21st-century American non-fiction writers
American foreign policy writers